Harveys is a handbag design and manufacturing company in Santa Ana, California, United States. The handbags use a woven design with seatbelts as the medium. All of their bags are handcrafted in the United States.

History
Founded in 1997, Harveys was created while Dana and Melanie Harvey were restoring a 1950 Buick. While installing seatbelts into the car, he decided to make a matching handbag for her. After this, they started making more for friends and family; with demand rising, they turned their garage into their first production site. The Buick was sold and used as capital to fund the growing business, which by 2004 had $3.1 million in revenue and had relocated to a  facility in Santa Ana. Orders for bags have been placed by Nordstrom and Bloomingdale's, among other retailers. The first retail store on Main Street in Santa Ana opened in 2007.

References

External links 
 www.seatbeltbags.com

Fashion accessory brands